William Henry Groom (9 March 1833 – 8 August 1901) was an Australian publican, newspaper proprietor, and politician who served as a member of the Parliament of Queensland from 1862 to 1901 and of the Parliament of Australia in 1901.

Early life
Groom was born at Plymouth, England, son of Thomas Groom, cordwainer, and his wife Maria, née Harkcom. Groom was educated at St Andrew's College, Plymouth, and apprenticed to a baker. He was transported from England to Australia as a convict in 1846 for seven years, having been convicted of embezzlement, aged just 13. He was eventually released, subsequently convicted again of a similar offence, and served gaol time in the goldfields in what would later be the colony of Victoria. After he was again released, Groom eventually found himself on the Darling Downs in Queensland, where, despite whispers about his chequered past, he became one of the leading members of society.

Career
In 1858 Groom became associated with Toowoomba in connection with his activities and as an auctioneer.

Groom was proprietor of The Toowoomba Chronicle newspaper and one of the founders of the Toowoomba Permanent Building Society (later Heritage Building Society). He was also involved in the creation of the Toowoomba Racecourse Clifford Park, the Toowoomba School of Arts and many other establishments.

Politics

Groom served as an alderman in the Borough of Toowoomba from 1861 to 1901, as well as the town's inaugural mayor in 1861. He went on to serve three consecutive terms as Mayor, and was re-elected to the position again in 1864, 1867, 1883 and 1884. During his first term as Mayor he successfully led his council to petition the colonial government for land for a town hall, a municipal market and the original site for Queens Park.

In 1862 Groom was elected to the Queensland Legislative Assembly in the electoral district of Toowoomba with a majority of 21 votes. He served as parliamentary speaker from 1883 to 1888.

Groom played a major role in the growth of Toowoomba by securing funding for bridges and arterial roads, the establishment of the General Hospital (now Queensland Health's Toowoomba Base Hospital) and Willowburn Hospital (now Baillie Henderson Hospital).

Groom was elected as a Protectionist to the Darling Downs electorate at the inaugural Australian federal election in 1901, becoming the only transported convict to ever sit as a member of the Australian Parliament.

Death
Unfortunately, he was given little time to enjoy the crowning glory of his political career, as he died on 8 August of the same year at the first Commonwealth Parliament meeting in Melbourne. He died of a combination of bronchial catarrh and heart failure. Groom was the first serving member of the Australian Parliament to die. (Sir James Dickson, Minister for Defence, had died in January, but that was before the first parliament had been elected). Groom's body was returned to Queensland for burial in the Drayton and Toowoomba Cemetery.

Legacy

William Henry Groom was succeeded as the member for Darling Downs by his third son Littleton Groom, who won the seat in Australia's first federal by-election and later became Speaker of the House of Representatives.

William Henry Groom was also the father of Queensland State parliamentarian (MLC) Henry Littleton Groom.

His home, Millbrook, is listed on the Queensland Heritage Register.

See also
List of convicts transported to Australia

References

D. B. Waterson, 'Groom, William Henry (1833 - 1901)', Australian Dictionary of Biography, Volume 4, MUP, 1972, pp. 304–305. Retrieved on 30 December 2008.

External links

The Toowoomba Chronicle
The Life of W. H. Groom (with special reference to Federation)
William Henry Groom, convict Queenslander

Further reading

1833 births
1901 deaths
Members of the Australian House of Representatives for Darling Downs
Convicts transported to Australia
Mayors of Toowoomba
Members of the Queensland Legislative Assembly
Speakers of the Queensland Legislative Assembly
Australian auctioneers
Protectionist Party members of the Parliament of Australia
19th-century Australian politicians
20th-century Australian politicians
19th-century Australian businesspeople